The year 2007 in Portugal.

Incumbents
President: Aníbal Cavaco Silva
Prime Minister: José Sócrates

Events

May
May 3: Disappearance of Madeleine McCann, in Praia da Luz, Algarve.
May 29: Prime Minister José Sócrates visits Russia.
May 30: General strike.

June
June 25: Opening of the Berardo Museum in Lisbon.

July
July 1: Beginning of the Portuguese presidency of the European Union.
July 4: The 1st EU-Brazil summit takes place in Lisbon.
July 15: Local elections in Lisbon. António Costa is elected mayor.

September
September 28: Luís Filipe Menezes wins the  elections in PSD and become the leader of the main opposition party.

October
October 25: Visit of the President of Russia Vladimir Putin to Portugal.
October 26: EU-Russia summit in Mafra.

November
November 5: A road accident on Auto-estrada A23, in the municipality of Vila Velha de Ródão, killed 15 people and injured 22.

December
December 8 - December 9: Africa-EU Summit.
December 13: Signing of the Treaty of Lisbon.

Arts & literature

New Books

Awards

Music

Television

Film
 October 25: Premiere of A Outra Margem.

Internet

Sport
May 20: F.C. Porto wins the football championship.
May 26: Ovarense wins the basketball championship.
May 27: Sporting C.P. wins the football cup final against C.F. Os Belenenses.

Deaths
January 19: Fiama Hasse Pais Brandão
January 23: A. H. de Oliveira Marques
March 1: Manuel Bento
March 26: João Soares Louro (pt)
May 21: Alberto Vilaça
July 4: Henrique Viana
July 15: Alberto Romão Dias
August 25: Eduardo Prado Coelho
August 27: Alberto de Lacerda
October 9: Fausto Correia

See also
List of Portuguese films of 2007

References

 
Portugal
Years of the 21st century in Portugal
Portugal